Dirty Projectors is an American indie rock band from Brooklyn, New York, formed in 2002. The band is the project of singer-songwriter David Longstreth, who has served as the band's sole constant member throughout numerous line-up changes. The band's current line-up consists of Longstreth, alongside Mike Daniel Johnson (drums), Maia Friedman (vocals, guitar, keyboards), Felicia Douglass (vocals, percussion, keyboards) and Kristin Slipp (vocals, keyboards). 

Since its formation, Dirty Projectors has released eight full-length studio albums, with the project featuring major contributions from co-lead vocalist and guitarist Amber Coffman from 2006 to 2013. Following the release of Rise Above (2007), an album of Black Flag songs as re-imagined from memory, Dirty Projectors released their break-through album, Bitte Orca in 2009. Featuring lead vocals from Longstreth, Coffman, and Angel Deradoorian, the album received widespread critical acclaim and increased the band's exposure significantly. Its follow-up, Swing Lo Magellan (2012) was released to further acclaim.

Following the departure of Coffman in 2013, Longstreth focused Dirty Projectors into a mostly studio-based project, releasing the albums, Dirty Projectors and Lamp Lit Prose, in 2017 and 2018, respectively. Dirty Projectors became a full band once again in 2018 with the addition of co-lead vocalists Felicia Douglass, Maia Friedman and Kristin Slipp to tour in support of Lamp Lit Prose. Inspired by the chemistry and dynamic of the band's current line-up, the group recorded and released five EPs across 2020, which were collected into the compilation, 5EPs.

History

Early years and Rise Above (2002–07) 
While studying at Yale, Longstreth spent part of the years 2001 and 2002 working on a number of musical ideas, together with his brother Jake. This resulted in the album, The Graceful Fallen Mango, that was released in 2002 under his own name and introduced his distinctive use of song arrangements and his combination of lo-fi and hi-fi production. With the help of Adam Forkner of Yume Bitsu, Longstreth recorded and released The Glad Fact on the Western Vinyl label under the name "The Dirty Projectors" in 2003. Two years later, the band released The Getty Address, a concept album about the musician Don Henley that features extensive orchestral and choral accompaniment. The stripped-down New Attitude EP followed in 2006 and featured inklings of the band's later vocal interplay and guitar work.

In 2007, the band released Rise Above, an album of Black Flag songs as re-imagined from memory. The album introduced the band's distinctive contrast between Longstreth's vocals and the hocketed harmonies of Amber Coffman and Susanna Waiche, who was later replaced by Angel Deradoorian. In support of the album, the band performed songs for a Take Away Show acoustic video session shot by Vincent Moon.

Domino Records, Bitte Orca, and Mount Wittenberg Orca (2008–11) 

In April 2008, Dirty Projectors signed with Domino Records, and the label announced the release of their fifth full-length album, Bitte Orca, for June 9, 2009. Bitte Orca introduced additional backing vocalist/auxiliary percussionist Haley Dekle as a new member and bassist Nat Baldwin returning to the band (he previously was a member of Dirty Projectors from 2005 to 2006). That year, the band also collaborated with David Byrne on the song "Knotty Pine" for the compilation album Dark Was the Night produced by the Red Hot Organization. Byrne joined the Dirty Projectors onstage to perform this song, along with "Ambulance Man," another collaborative track not included on the compilation, at the "Dark Was the Night Live" concert at New York City's Radio City Music Hall on May 3, 2009.

“Stillness Is the Move" was the first single released from Bitte Orca, a West African and alternative R&B-influenced hybrid, sung by Coffman and inspired by the Wim Wenders film Wings of Desire. Bitte Orca was met with positive reviews, including Rolling Stone magazine rating the album as number 6 on their best 25 albums of 2009.

Dirty Projectors were to release a new EP in September 2009 titled Temecula Sunrise. While the EP was never released, two of its tracks, "Ascending Melody" and "Emblem of the World", were instead offered for free download on the Dirty Projectors website in early 2010.

On May 8, 2009, members of Dirty Projectors collaborated with Björk to perform an original composition by Longstreth, written for five voices and acoustic guitar, as part of a charity concert to benefit Housing Works, a nonprofit organization dedicated to providing shelter for homeless men, women, and children suffering from AIDS. The concert was held at the Housing Works Bookstore & Café in downtown New York City. On June 30, 2010, Dirty Projectors announced the release of Mount Wittenberg Orca, a digital-only EP with Björk based on the artists' collaboration. Mount Wittenberg Orca was released physically by Domino Records in 2011.

Swing Lo Magellan (2012–2015) 
On March 30, 2012, Dirty Projectors released the first single from their sixth album, Swing Lo Magellan, "Gun Has No Trigger". The album was released on July 10 in the United States and on July 9 internationally.

On September 7, 2012, Dirty Projectors released a short film, directed by Longstreth, called "Hi Custodian".

On November 6, 2012, Dirty Projectors released About to Die EP, a digital- and vinyl-release EP featuring several new tracks.

In 2015, members of Dirty Projectors made a cameo appearance as themselves in the Noah Baumbach film Mistress America.

Dirty Projectors, Lamp Lit Prose, and new line-up  (2016–2019) 
On September 19, 2016, Dirty Projectors began releasing videos and images on social media teasing new music. After the release of tracks "Keep Your Name", "Little Bubble" and "Up in Hudson", it was announced that the seventh, self-titled album, would be released on February 24, 2017 via Domino. The album was ultimately released three days early, on February 21, 2017. It marked a return to the group's solo roots for Longstreth (who at this point relocated to Los Angeles, California to build a recording studio called "Ivo Shandor"), introduced a more electronic-based alternative R&B sound, and addressed his breakup with Coffman, his former bandmate and girlfriend.

The following year, on July 13, 2018, Dirty Projectors released their eighth album, Lamp Lit Prose, after teasing three singles, "Break Thru", "That's a Lifestyle", and "I Feel Energy". The touring of the album marked the revival of Dirty Projectors as a group project, with David Longstreth on lead vocals and guitar; returning members Nat Baldwin and Mike Daniel Johnson on bass/bass synth and drums, respectively; and introducing Maia Friedman on guitar, keyboards, and backing vocals, Felicia Douglass on percussion, keyboards, and backing vocals, and Kristin Slipp on keyboards and backing vocals.

In late 2018, the band recorded a live in-studio album at New York City's Power Station to capture road-tested live arrangements of songs they had been performing on the Lamp Lit Prose tour. The album, Sing the Melody was released on December 10, 2019 on Domino Documents.

Five EPs (2020) 
In 2020, the band announced that it would release five EPs throughout the year, with Longstreth noting: "For me, this cycle of EPs is about growth, transition, liminal space, shifting identity. Allen Ginsberg had a phrase, 'first thought, best thought,' to talk about a particular kind of writing — not automatic writing exactly, but quick, spontaneous, trusting. For me, these songs are about rediscovering that place, after the stereo ouroboros of the Ivo Shandor [Studio] era (Dirty Projectors & Lamp Lit Prose). And I think for us — Felicia, Maia, Kristin, Mike and me — it’s about finding it for the first time: playing, writing, learning together as a new band."

The first EP, Windows Open was released on March 27, 2020. The EP featured lead vocals and writing from Friedman with writing, production, and mixing handled by Longstreth. Oliver Hill from Vagabon added string arrangements to the release.  The second EP, Flight Tower, appeared in May. It featured lead vocals from Douglass, and was preceded by the single, "Lose Your Love". Outlets like Pitchfork praised Douglass' smooth, cool idiosyncratic vocal contributions. Early September the Bossa Nova inspired Super João appeared. This was followed by the Earth Crisis EP in October, which featured lead vocals from Slipp and arrangements for string quartet and wind quintet by Longstreth. The recordings of these arrangements, which provide the backbone of the EP's sound, were initially made with Chris Taylor in 2008 as orchestral reinterpretations of 2007's Rise Above, and then re-sampled by Longstreth in the production of Earth Crisis. The EP was accompanied by a short film directed by Isaiah Saxon. The final installment entitled Ring Road, featuring all five members, was released in November. The record company compiled all five as the 20-track album 5EPs.

Musical style 
Dirty Projectors have been described musically as an indie rock, art pop, indie pop, progressive pop and chamber pop group.

While often associated with the late 2000s New York indie rock scene, critics have linked Dirty Projectors to musicians from many genres, including new wave artists David Byrne and Squeeze, pop stars Beyoncé and Mariah Carey, and progressive rock musicians Frank Zappa and Yes. In a 2009 interview, Longstreth embraced some of these comparisons but expressed a dislike for several of those musicians, commenting, "Steely Dan is a band I’m not that into," "I’m not a huge Yes guy," and "Frank Zappa I fucking hate."

Members 

Current members
 David Longstreth – lead vocals, guitar, various instruments (2002–present)
 Mike Daniel Johnson – drums (2012–2013; 2017–present)
 Maia Friedman – guitar, keyboards, lead and backing vocals (2018–present)
 Felicia Douglass – percussion, keyboards, lead and backing vocals (2018–present)
 Kristin Slipp – keyboards, lead and backing vocals (2018–present)

Former members
 Adam Forkner – drums (2002–2005)
 Jake Longstreth – backing vocals (2002; 2016)
 Yasemin Schatz – flute (2004)
 Rostam Batmanglij – flute, keyboards, percussion, backing vocals (2004–2005)
 Larkin Grimm – backing vocals (2004–2005)
 Jona Bechtolt – keyboards, drums (2004–2005)
 Ezra Koenig – saxophone, guitar, electric piano, backing vocals (2004–2005; 2016)
 Anneli Chambliss – backing vocals (2005)
 Emily Cheeger – backing vocals (2005)
 Alex Farrill – keyboards, drums, backing vocals (2005)
 Spencer Kingman – guitar, backing vocals (2005–2006)
 Charlie Looker – guitar, backing vocals (2005–2006)
 Will Glass – drums (2005–2006)
 Nat Baldwin – bass, keyboards (2005–2006; 2007–2013; 2016; 2017; 2018–2019)
 Susanna Waiche – backing vocals (2006)
 Brian McOmber – drums (2006–2012)
 Amber Coffman – co-lead and backing vocals, guitar (2006–2013)
 Sharon Nakhimovsky – violin (2007)
 Jessica Pavone – viola (2007)
 Angel Deradoorian – co-lead and backing vocals, guitar, keyboards, bass (2007–2012; 2013)
 Jordan Dykstra – viola (2008–2009)
 Haley Louise Dekle – percussion, backing vocals (2008–2013)
 Olga Bell – keyboards, backing vocals (2011–2013; 2017)
 Jenn Wasner – guitar, backing vocals (2012)
 Clarice Jensen – viola (2012; 2017)
 Nadia Sirota – viola (2012; 2017)
 Steve Marion – guitar, backing vocals (2013)
 Tyondai Braxton – keyboards (2017)
 Mauro Refosco – percussion (2017)
 Francisco Javier Paredes – percussion (2017)
 Teresa Eggers – backing vocals (2017)

Discography

Studio albums 
 The Glad Fact (2003)
 Morning Better Last! (2003)
 Slaves' Graves and Ballads (2004)
 The Getty Address (2005)
 Rise Above (2007)
 Bitte Orca (2009)
 Swing Lo Magellan (2012)
 Dirty Projectors (2017)
 Lamp Lit Prose (2018)

EPs 
 New Attitude (2006)
 Mount Wittenberg Orca (2010) (with Björk)
 About to Die (2012)
 Windows Open (2020)
 Flight Tower (2020)
 Super João (2020)
 Earth Crisis (2020)
 Ring Road (2020)

Compilations
 5EPs (2020)

Live albums
 Sing the Melody (2019)

References

External links 

 
 Dirty Projectors Domino Records page
 Dirty Projectors Western Vinyl page
 
 Dirty Projectors in concert on NPR Music
 Dirty Projectors on Beyond Race Magazine (BRM)
 Dead Oceans Page
 Dirty Projectors & Björk on the Rob da Bank show

Indie rock musical groups from New York (state)
Musical groups established in 2002
Musical groups from Brooklyn
Musical groups from Los Angeles
Musical groups from New York City
2002 establishments in New York City
Domino Recording Company artists
Dead Oceans artists
Western Vinyl artists